The Father of the Nation is an honorific title given to a person considered the driving force behind the establishment of a country, state, or nation. In monarchies, the monarch is often considered the "father/mother of the nation" or as a patriarch to guide his family. This concept is expressed in the divine right of kings espoused in some monarchies, while in others it is codified into constitutional law.

In Spain, the monarch is considered the personification and embodiment, the symbol of unity and permanence of the nation. In Thailand, the monarch is given the same recognition, and any person who expresses disrespect toward the reigning monarch faces severe criminal penalties.

Many dictators bestow titles upon themselves, which rarely survive the end of their regime. Gnassingbé Eyadéma of Togo's titles included "father of the nation", "older brother", and "Guide of the People". Mobutu Sese Seko of Zaire's included "Father of the nation", "the Guide", "the Messiah", "the Leopard", "the Sun-President", and "the Cock who Jumps on Anything That Moves". In postcolonial Africa, "father of the nation" was a title used by many leaders both to refer to their role in the independence movement as a source of legitimacy, and to use paternalist symbolism as a source of continued popularity. On Joseph Stalin's seventieth birthday in 1949, he was bestowed with the title "Father of Nations" for his establishment of "people's democracies" in countries occupied by the USSR after World War II.

The title "Father of the Nation" is sometimes politically contested. The 1972 Constitution of Bangladesh declared Sheikh Mujibur Rahman to be "father of the nation". A motion in the Parliament of Slovakia to proclaim controversial pre-war leader Andrej Hlinka "father of the nation" barely failed in September 2007.

List
The following people are still often called the "Father" of their respective nations. Highlighted names indicate people who are still living.

Notes

References

Works cited

See also
Family as a model for the state
Fathers of Confederation
Founding fathers of the European Union
Founding Fathers of the United States
List of national founders
Pater Patriae
Victory title

Honorifics
Political terminology
Titles held only by one person
Nation
Fatherhood
Men's social titles